Sara I. Gideon (born December 4, 1971) is an American politician who served as the Speaker of the Maine House of Representatives. A member of the Democratic Party from Freeport, she represented the 48th district in the Maine House of Representatives, which includes part of Freeport and Pownal in Cumberland County.

Gideon was the Democratic nominee for the 2020 U.S. Senate election in Maine, losing to incumbent Republican Susan Collins.

Early life and education 
Gideon was born and raised in Rhode Island. Her father, a pediatrician, is from India and her mother, a nurse clinician, is a second-generation Armenian American.

Gideon is the youngest of four siblings, one of whom, Melanie, is a novelist. She graduated from East Greenwich High School in East Greenwich, Rhode Island, in 1989. In 1994, she earned a Bachelor of Arts in international affairs from George Washington University's Elliott School of International Affairs in Washington, D.C.

Career

Early career 
She served as an intern for U.S. Senator Claiborne Pell. She also worked as an advertising account executive at USA Today.

In 2004, Gideon moved to Freeport, Maine. In October 2009, she won a seat on the Freeport Town Council. She served until 2012, and was the council's vice chair beginning in 2011.

Maine House of Representatives
First elected to the Maine House of Representatives in 2012, Gideon was reelected in 2014 and chosen as Assistant Majority Leader. In 2016, she was elected as Speaker by the House. As speaker, Gideon also supported Medicaid expansion in Maine, including the 2017 referendum on the topic, and helped override Governor Paul LePage's veto of a bill to make the anti-overdose drug naloxone (Narcan) available over-the-counter, aimed at preventing deaths from the opioid epidemic.

Gideon was a member of the Legislature's Joint Standing Committee on Energy, Utilities and Technology. According to India Abroad, "she worked to lower energy costs, encourage increased energy efficiency and promote clean and renewable energy to capitalize on Maine's natural resources and build a clean-energy economy."

After Democratic Governor Janet Mills was elected in 2018, the Maine Legislature under Gideon's speakership passed several key climate change bills, including a measure requiring Maine to achieve 80 percent renewable energy by 2030 and 100 percent by 2050. As speaker in 2019 and 2020, Gideon also sponsored legislation to expand abortion access by allowing physician assistants and advanced practice registered nurses to perform the procedure. She sponsored legislation to block the Quebec power company Hydro-Québec from spending money to influence a referendum of a controversial proposed power line project in Maine.

In 2019, Gideon faced an election ethics complaint for accepting reimbursements for her personal political donations from her own PAC. A spokesperson said, "The contributions were within the legal limit and fully disclosed, but the committee was given incorrect guidance on how to process them." The campaign said that it had reimbursed the federal government $3,250 for the violations and closed the PAC. In October 2019, the Maine Ethics Commission voted unanimously to fine the closed PAC $500.

2020 U.S. Senate campaign

On June 24, 2019, Gideon announced her candidacy in the 2020 Senate election to challenge incumbent Republican Susan Collins. In the first week of her campaign, she raised more than $1 million. Gideon ran against Betsy Sweet and Bre Kidman in the ranked-choice Democratic primary election. In the primary, Gideon received support from the mainstream of the Democratic Party, while Sweet and Kidman drew support from the party's insurgent progressive wing. Before the July 14 primary, Gideon was endorsed by the Democratic Senatorial Campaign Committee as well as labor unions and women's groups. Gideon led in primary election polling, and won the primary with roughly 70% of the vote. By the time of the primary election, she had raised $23 million.

In 2019, the League of Conservation Voters Action Fund endorsed Gideon. Following her Democratic primary win in June, Gideon received endorsements from NARAL, EMILY's List, Progressive Democrats of America, Brand New Congress, and Our Revolution. In August, former President Barack Obama endorsed Gideon. In 2020, the Human Rights Campaign (HRC), the country's largest LGBTQ rights advocacy organization, opposed the reelection of Susan Collins and instead endorsed Gideon. It is the first time that the HRC has opposed Collins, who has been seen as a key Republican vote on LGBTQ rights.

The Bangor Daily News endorsed Gideon in the Democratic primary in June 2020.

Political positions
Gideon states that she has made affordable drugs and health care her primary campaign issues. She supports the Affordable Care Act ("Obamacare"). She also supports a public health insurance option, which would allow Americans to buy into Medicare while also retaining a private health insurance market. She supports allowing Medicare to negotiate lower prices for prescription drugs, and a prohibition on pharmaceutical company "pay to delay" agreements.

In the state House, Gideon sponsored legislation to expand abortion access and extend benefits to families in poverty. She states she will fight any attempts to attack or defund Planned Parenthood; will work to roll back the Title X gag rule, which has impacted Maine Family Planning and Planned Parenthood clinics. Gideon has been endorsed by Planned Parenthood Action Fund and NARAL. Gideon opposed the Trump tax bill. Gideon supports the U.S. rejoining the Paris Agreement to combat climate change; the U.S. entered the agreement under Barack Obama, but withdrew under Donald Trump. She supports government funding for the development of renewable energy (e.g. solar, wind, geo-thermal) and the federal regulation of greenhouse gas emissions. Gideon supports universal background checks and red flag laws, and has expressed support for high-capacity magazine restrictions. Gideon supports various police reforms, including a police misconduct registry and requirements for the use of body cameras and vehicle cameras.

Personal life
Gideon married attorney Benjamin Rogoff Gideon, in November 2001. Ben Gideon is a medical malpractice and personal injury attorney at Gideon Asen LLC.

Electoral history

2012

2014

2016

2018

2020

See also
List of female speakers of legislatures in the United States

References

External links

Sara Gideon for Maine official campaign website
Sara Gideon government website

|-

|-

1971 births
21st-century American politicians
21st-century American women politicians
American advertising executives
American people of Armenian descent
American politicians of Indian descent
Candidates in the 2020 United States Senate elections
Elliott School of International Affairs alumni
Living people
Maine city council members
Majority leaders of the Maine House of Representatives
People from Freeport, Maine
People from East Greenwich, Rhode Island
Speakers of the Maine House of Representatives
Democratic Party members of the Maine House of Representatives
Women city councillors in Maine
Women legislative speakers
Women state legislators in Maine